Lipstick Killers – The Mercer Street Sessions 1972 is a 1981 album of demos by the New York Dolls. The album's songs were later re-recorded for New York Dolls, except for "Don't Start Me Talking" and "Human Being" which were later re-recorded for Too Much Too Soon and "Don't Mess with Cupid", which was never re-recorded.

The producer of the Mercer Street Sessions, Marty Thau, was the person who discovered and managed the Dolls.

Track listing
"Bad Girl" (David Johansen, Johnny Thunders)
"Looking for a Kiss" (Johansen, Thunders)
"Don't Start Me Talking" (Sonny Boy Williamson II)
"Don't Mess with Cupid" (Deanie Parker, Eddie Floyd, Steve Cropper)
"Human Being" (Johansen, Thunders)
"Personality Crisis" (Johansen, Thunders)
"Pills" (Bo Diddley)
"Jet Boy" (Johansen, Thunders)
"Frankenstein" (Johansen, Sylvain Sylvain)

Personnel
New York Dolls
David Johansen - vocals, harmonica
Johnny Thunders - guitar, backing vocals
Sylvain Sylvain - guitar
Arthur "Killer" Kane - bass guitar
Billy Murcia - drums

References 

1981 albums
New York Dolls albums
ROIR albums
Demo albums